Bentley is a city in Sedgwick County, Kansas, United States.  As of the 2020 census, the population of the city was 560.  It is located northwest of Wichita, approximately 4 miles north of K-96 highway at the intersection of 151st W & 109th N.

History
In 1887, the Kansas Midland Railway was built from Wichita to Ellsworth, a distance of 107 miles, and the building of this line bisected Eagle township and established a depot and town on section 11, Eagle township. The town was named in honor of Orr. H. Bentley, of Wichita. The local railway company was composed of Wichita men; the directors were ex-Governor W. E. Stanley, J. Oak Davidson, Robert E. Lawrence, Charles R. Miller, Orsemus H. Bentley and H. G. Lee. When organized this railway company was officered by C. R. Miller, president; J. Oak Davidson, treasurer, and O. H. Bentley, secretary. It was constructed by the Kansas Construction and Improvement Company, an aggregation of Hartford and eastern capital. The line was purchased outright by The Frisco on October 1, 1900. The Frisco was merged into the Burlington Northern Railroad in 1980, and the Burlington Northern abandoned the line in 1994.

Bentley was laid out in 1888. It is named in honor of the city's founder Orsemus Hills Bentley, a railroad official.

The first post office in Bentley was established in March 1888.

Geography
Bentley is located at  (37.886437, -97.517133).

Demographics

2010 census
As of the census of 2010, there were 530 people, 199 households, and 142 families residing in the city. The racial makeup of the city was 92.1% White, 0.9% African American, 3.0% Native American, 0.8% Asian, 2.1% from other races, and 1.1% from two or more races. Hispanic or Latino of any race were 7.2% of the population.

There were 199 households, of which 38.2% had children under the age of 18 living with them, 59.3% were married couples living together, 8.5% had a female householder with no husband present, 3.5% had a male householder with no wife present, and 28.6% were non-families. 24.1% of all households were made up of individuals, and 6% had someone living alone who was 65 years of age or older. The average household size was 2.66 and the average family size was 3.16.

The median age in the city was 35.2 years. 27.7% of residents were under the age of 18; 7.2% were between the ages of 18 and 24; 28.1% were from 25 to 44; 27.6% were from 45 to 64; and 9.4% were 65 years of age or older. The gender makeup of the city was 53.2% male and 46.8% female.

2000 census
As of the census of 2000, there were 368 people, 139 households, and 107 families residing in the city. The racial makeup of the city was 95.92% White, 0.54% Native American, 0.27% Asian, 1.36% from other races, and 1.90% from two or more races. Hispanic or Latino of any race were 3.26% of the population.

There were 139 households, out of which 41.7% had children under the age of 18 living with them, 63.3% were married couples living together, 7.2% had a female householder with no husband present, and 23.0% were non-families. 22.3% of all households were made up of individuals, and 9.4% had someone living alone who was 65 years of age or older. The average household size was 2.65 and the average family size was 3.05.

In the city, the population was spread out, with 30.7% under the age of 18, 7.3% from 18 to 24, 29.3% from 25 to 44, 21.7% from 45 to 64, and 10.9% who were 65 years of age or older. The median age was 35 years. For every 100 females, there were 104.4 males. For every 100 females age 18 and over, there were 102.4 males.

As of 2000 the median income for a household in the city was $39,375, and the median income for a family was $46,250. Males had a median income of $32,083 versus $25,694 for females. The per capita income for the city was $16,111. About 8.2% of families and 9.0% of the population were below the poverty line, including 15.4% of those under age 18 and 5.9% of those age 65 or over.

Government
The Bentley government consists of a mayor and five council members. The council meets the 2nd and 4th Thursday of each month at 7:30PM.

Education
The community is served by Halstead–Bentley USD 440 public school district.

References

Further reading

External links
 City of Bentley
 Bentley - Directory of Public Officials
 Bentley city map, KDOT

Cities in Kansas
Cities in Sedgwick County, Kansas
Wichita, KS Metropolitan Statistical Area
Populated places established in 1888
1888 establishments in Kansas